Kaduy is the name of several inhabited localities in Russia.

Urban localities
Kaduy, Vologda Oblast, a work settlement in Kaduysky District of Vologda Oblast

Rural localities
Kaduy, Irkutsk Oblast, a village in Nizhneudinsky District of Irkutsk Oblast
Kaduy, Chuprinsky Selsoviet, Kaduysky District, Vologda Oblast, a village in Chuprinsky Selsoviet of Kaduysky District in Vologda Oblast